This is a list of electoral district results for the 1968 New South Wales state election.

Results by Electoral district

Albury

Armidale

Ashfield

Auburn

Balmain 

The two candidate preferred vote was not counted between the Labor and Independent candidates for Balmain.

Bankstown

Barwon

Bass Hill

Bathurst 

Gus Kelly died in 1967 and Clive Osborne won the seat at the resulting by-election.

Blacktown

Bligh

Blue Mountains

Bondi

Broken Hill 

Broken Hill was a new seat, and consisted of parts of the abolished districts of Cobar and Sturt and was the first time since 1913 where all of the town of Broken Hill was in the one district. Lew Johnstone (Labor) was the member for Cobar. The member for Sturt, William Wattison (Labor), did not contest the election.

Bulli

Burrendong

Burrinjuck

Burwood

Byron

Campbelltown

Canterbury

Castlereagh

Cessnock

Clarence

Collaroy

Coogee

Cook's River

Corrimal

Cronulla

Drummoyne 

Drummoyne became a notionally Liberal seat in the redistribution.

Dubbo

Earlwood

East Hills

Eastwood

Fairfield

Fuller

Georges River

Gloucester

Gordon

Gosford

Goulburn

Granville

Hamilton

Hawkesbury

Hornsby

Hurstville

Kahibah

Kembla

King

Kirribilli

Kogarah

Lake Macquarie

Lakemba

Lane Cove

Lismore

Liverpool

Maitland

Manly

Maroubra

Marrickville

Merrylands

Monaro

Mosman

Murray

Murrumbidgee

Nepean

Newcastle

Northcott

Orange

Oxley

Parramatta

Phillip

Raleigh

Randwick

Rockdale

South Coast

Sutherland 

 Sutherland became a notionally Liberal seat at the redistribution.

Tamworth

Temora

Tenterfield

The Hills

Upper Hunter

Vaucluse

Wagga Wagga

Wakehurst

Wallsend

Waratah

Wentworthville

Willoughby

Wollondilly

Wollongong

Wyong

Yaralla 

Yaralla was a new seat, largely replacing the abolished district of Concord. The member for Concord was Thomas Murphy (Labor).

Young

See also 
 Candidates of the 1968 New South Wales state election
 Members of the New South Wales Legislative Assembly, 1968–1971

References 

1968